Squatters is a 2014 American direct-to-video independent drama film directed by Martin Weisz and starring Gabriella Wilde, Thomas Dekker, Richard Dreyfuss, and Luke Grimes.

Premise
A homeless couple from Venice Beach begins squatting in a mansion in the Pacific Palisades but are discovered when the homeowners return from vacation early.

Cast
Gabriella Wilde as Kelly
Thomas Dekker as Jonas
Richard Dreyfuss as David
Lolita Davidovich as Evelyn
Luke Grimes as Michael
Andrew Howard as Ronald
Evan Ross as AJ
Nancy Travis as Carol

References

External links
 
 

2014 films
American direct-to-video films
American drama films
Films about homelessness
Films set in Los Angeles County, California
Films set in 2013
Squatting in film
Films directed by Martin Weisz
2010s English-language films
2010s American films
2014 drama films
2014 independent films
American independent films